Réunion, is an overseas département of France.

The island's conventional name is the Department of Réunion, or Réunion. The French flag is used on the island. The island's capital is Saint-Denis, and the island is divided into 4 arrondissements, 24 communes and 25 cantons.

Réunion is governed by French law under Article 73 of the Constitution of France, under which the laws and regulations are applicable as of right, as in metropolitan France. Suffrage is granted universally to all those over the age of 18.

Executive branch 
The chief of state is the French President Emmanuel Macron, who is represented by Prefect Jacques Billant. The president of the General Council, who acts as head of the government, is Nassimah Dindar. The President of the Regional Council is Didier Robert.

Elections held in Réunion include the French presidential vote. A prefect is appointed by the president on the advice of the French Ministry of the Interior. The presidents of the General and Regional Councils are elected by members of those councils.

Legislative branch 
The unicameral Departmental Council has 47 seats. The unicameral Regional Council has 45 seats. Members of both are elected by direct election for six-year terms.

Composition

Deputies 
Réunion elects seven deputies to the National Assembly for five-year terms.

Senators 
Réunion elects four senators to the Senate for six-year terms.

European Parliament 
Réunion participates in French elections to the European Parliament as a part of the Indian Ocean section of the Overseas constituency, which also includes Mayotte. Younous Omarjee, from Réunion, is one of the three MEPs representing the constituency.

Judicial branch 
The Judicial branch of the overseas département is run by the Cour d'Appel (Court of Appeals).

International organization participation 
Reunion is a member in the Indian Ocean Commission (InOC) since 1986, and of the World Federation of Trade Unions.

See also 
 Elections in Réunion
 Regional Council of Réunion

References 

Réunion